On 29 December 2022, twelve oil workers were killed by gunmen near Deir ez-Zor. Kurdish forces arrested 52 militants and the Syrian Observatory for Human Rights claimed the Islamic State were responsible.

References

See also 

 2012 Deir ez-Zor bombing
 2020 Deir ez-Zor ambush

Deir ez-Zor
Terrorist incidents in Syria in 2022
December 2022 events in Syria
ISIL terrorist incidents in Syria
2022 in the Syrian civil war
Deir ez-Zor Governorate in the Syrian civil war